Malarinia calcopercula is a species of small land snail with an operculum, a terrestrial gastropod mollusk in the family Diplommatinidae.

Distribution
This land snail is endemic to Madagascar.

Habitat
This species lives in subtropical or tropical dry forests.

References

Malarinia
Molluscs of Madagascar
Taxonomy articles created by Polbot